F.lli Polli SpA is an Italian food company. It produces preserved vegetables, both pickled and in oil, in glass containers.

History 

The company was founded in Milan in 1872. The head office is now in Monsummano Terme, in Tuscany in central Italy. The company has three factories in Italy and Spain. It processes about 18,000 tons of vegetables per year, and produces some 45 million jars of food.

In 2019 it acquired Valbona, a manufacturer of pesto in Padova, for €13 million.

References

Manufacturing companies established in 1872
Food and drink companies of Italy
Italian brands
Italian companies established in 1872